Travelstart is an African online travel booking website, offering flights, hotel bookings, car rental, vacation packages and other travel services through an online booking engine

It operates in South Africa, Bahrain, Botswana, Egypt, Kenya, Kuwait, Morocco, Namibia, Nigeria, Oman, Qatar, Saudi Arabia, Tanzania Turkey, United Arab Emirates and Zimbabwe. It trades in some territories as Geziko.

The website uses global distribution systems such as Amadeus IT Group and Travelfusion for flights, and CarTrawler for online car hire bookings. Most revenue is generated from Pay per click (PPC) advertising, as well as an extensive affiliate network. All Travelstart websites use Thawte to secure online payments.

The website was founded in Sweden in 1999 by Stephan Ekbergh. Before launching Travelstart, Ekbergh founded Sweden's first online travel agency, Mr Jet (1995). In 2010, Travelstart Nordic was sold to European Travel Interactive AB(eTRAVELi) and the company headquarters was moved to Cape Town, South Africa. Travelstart operates in South Africa since 2006, and emerging markets throughout Africa. In 2012, Travelstart Nigeria was launched. and later Travelstart Egypt, which is located in Maadi district of Greater Cairo.

In December 2019, Travelstart acquired competitor Jumia Travel from Jumia. Under the purchase agreement, Travelstart took control of Jumia Travel's online book websites.

References

External links
 
 Travelstart Kenya website
 Travelstart Egypt website

Travel ticket search engines
Swedish travel websites
Online travel agencies
Hospitality companies established in 1999
Internet properties established in 1999
South African travel websites
Tourism in the Western Cape
Companies based in Cape Town
1999 establishments in Sweden
2010 establishments in South Africa